Canoe and kayak were held at the 2006 Asian Games in Doha, Qatar from December 10 to December 14. Men's and women's competitions were held in kayak and men's competition in canoe with all events having taken place at the West Bay Lagoon. The competition included only sprint events.

Schedule

Medalists

Men

Women

Medal table

Participating nations
A total of 103 athletes from 17 nations competed in canoeing at the 2006 Asian Games:

References 

Official Website

External links 
Asian Canoe Confederation

 
2006 Asian Games events
Asian Games
2006